Silvia Hernández may refer to:

 Silvia Hernández Enríquez, Mexican politician, born 1948
 Silvia Hernández Sánchez, Costa Rican politician, born 1976